The 2015 Big 12 men's basketball tournament was the postseason men's basketball tournament for the Big 12 Conference. It was played from March 11 to 14 in Kansas City, Missouri at the Sprint Center. Iowa State won the tournament for the 3rd time and received the conference's automatic bid to the 2015 NCAA tournament.

Seeding
The Tournament consisted of a 10 team single-elimination tournament with the top 6 seeds receiving a bye.

Schedule

Bracket

* denotes overtime period

All-Tournament Team
Most Outstanding Player – Georges Niang, Iowa State

See also
2015 Big 12 Conference women's basketball tournament
2015 NCAA Division I men's basketball tournament
2014–15 NCAA Division I men's basketball rankings

References

External links
Official 2015 Big 12 Men's Basketball Tournament Bracket
 

Tournament
Big 12 men's basketball tournament
Big 12 men's basketball tournament
Big 12 men's basketball tournament
College sports tournaments in Missouri